World number 1 ranked female tennis players is a year-by-year listing of the female tennis players who were ranked as world No. 1 by various contemporary and modern sources.

Notes:

 The Women's Tennis Association introduced a computerized ranking system in November 1975, which is incorporated into this list.
 The International Tennis Federation's year-end number 1 classification that was introduced in 1978 is no longer named as such, and has evolved into the ITF World Champion designation and award.
 The Women's Tennis Association has awarded a WTA Player of the Year award each year since 1977.

List of No. 1 ranked players

Pre-1920: National rankings; few sources available

1921–1967: The Amateur Era

1968–present: The Open Era

See also 
 List of WTA number 1 ranked singles tennis players
 ITF World Champions
 Top ten ranked female tennis players
 Top ten ranked female tennis players (1921–1974)
 World number 1 ranked male tennis players

Notes

References

Further reading

External links 

 ITF World Champions at the International Tennis Federation

 
1
1